Busan Foreign School (BFS) is an international school located Busan, South Korea, with an American style educational philosophy and curriculum. It has been fully CCP accredited (Pre-K–12th grade) since 1998.

Busan Foreign School opened in October 1996. With only two grades originally, it has since expanded to encompass early childhood to twelfth grade, currently educating over 240 students from 25 different nations.

References

External links
Official web site

International schools in Busan
1996 establishments in South Korea
Educational institutions established in 1996